MWFL may refer to:
 Mid West Football League, an Australian rules football competition based in the Eyre Peninsula region of South Australia
 Maritime Women's Football League, a Canadian football league in eastern Canada
 Midwest Football League (1935–1940), a minor professional American football league
 Midwest Football League (1962–1978), a minor professional American football league
 Midwest Football League (2002–), a semi-professional American football league whose Ohio River Bearcats team played at the Goebel Soccer Complex